Nitocrella is a genus of copepod. Although most other genera in the family Ameiridae are marine, species of Nitocrella are almost exclusively found in subterranean fresh water or brackish water. More than 80 species are included in the genus, including two which are listed as vulnerable species on the IUCN Red List:

Nitocrella absentia Karanovic, 2004
Nitocrella achaiae Pesce, 1981
Nitocrella aestuarina Coull & Bell, 1979
Nitocrella afghanica Sterba, 1973
Nitocrella africana Chappuis, 1955
Nitocrella akiereki Borutsky, 1978
Nitocrella asiatica (Sterba, 1967)
Nitocrella beatricis Cottarelli & Bruno, 1993
Nitocrella botosaneanui Petkovski, 1973
Nitocrella calcaripes Damian & Botosaneanu, 1954
Nitocrella caraioni Petkovski, 1976
Nitocrella chappuisi Kiefer, 1926
Nitocrella cubanorum Petkovski, 1976
Nitocrella delayi Rouch, 1970
Nitocrella divaricata (Chappuis, 1923)
Nitocrella dubia Chappuis, 1937
Nitocrella dussarti Chappuis & Rouch, 1959
Nitocrella elegans Chappuis & Rouch, 1959
Nitocrella ensifera Cottarelli, Bruno & Berera, 2007
Nitocrella fedelitae Pesce, 1985
Nitocrella gracilis Chappuis, 1955
Nitocrella halophila Noodt, 1952
Nitocrella herirudensis Sterba, 1973
Nitocrella hibernica (Brady, 1880)
Nitocrella hirta Chappuis, 1923
Nitocrella hofmilleri Brehm, 1953
Nitocrella hypogaea Shen & Tai, 1973
Nitocrella incerta (Chappuis, 1933)
Nitocrella insularis Miura, 1962
Nitocrella intermedia Chappuis, 1937
Nitocrella ioneli Dumont & Decraemer, 1974
Nitocrella iranica Löffler, 1959
Nitocrella jankowskajae Borutsky, 1972
Nitocrella japonica Miura, 1962
Nitocrella juturna Cottarelli, 1975
Nitocrella kirgizica Borutsky, 1972
Nitocrella kosswigi Noodt, 1954
Nitocrella kunzi Galassi & De Laurentiis, 1997
Nitocrella kyzylkumica Borutsky, 1972
Nitocrella ljovuschkini Borutsky, 1967
Nitocrella longa Karanovic, 2000
Nitocrella maggii Pesce, 1983
Nitocrella mara Löffler, 1959
Nitocrella marina Chappuis & Rouch, 1961
Nitocrella minoricae Chappuis & Rouch, 1959
Nitocrella monchenkoi Borutsky, 1972
Nitocrella montana Noodt, 1965
Nitocrella morettii Pesce, 1984
Nitocrella morimotoi Miura, 1962
Nitocrella motasi Petkovski, 1976
Nitocrella nana Sterba, 1973
Nitocrella negreai Petkovski, 1973
Nitocrella neutra Kiefer, 1933
Nitocrella obesa Karanovic, 2004
Nitocrella omega Hertzog, 1936
Nitocrella orghidani Petkovski, 1973
Nitocrella paceae Pesce, 1980
Nitocrella pescei Galassi & De Laurentiis, 1997
Nitocrella petkovskii Pesce, 1980
Nitocrella polychaeta Noodt, 1952
Nitocrella psammophila Chappuis, 1954
Nitocrella reducta Schäfer, 1936
Nitocrella rhodiensis Pesce, 1983
Nitocrella skyrensis Pesce, 1982
Nitocrella slovenica Petkovski, 1959  (Slovenia)
Nitocrella somalica Dumont, 1981
Nitocrella spinulosa Apostolov, 1991
Nitocrella stammeri Chappuis, 1938
Nitocrella sterbai Borutsky, 1969
Nitocrella stetinai Sterba, 1973
Nitocrella stochi Pesce & Galassi, 1987  (Italy)
Nitocrella stygia Apostolov, 1976
Nitocrella subterranea (Chappuis, 1928)
Nitocrella tianschanica Borutsky, 1972
Nitocrella tirolensis Kiefer, 1963
Nitocrella tonsa Mikhailova-Neikova, 1967
Nitocrella trajani Karanovic, 2004
Nitocrella tridens Bozic, 1969
Nitocrella tschaticalica Borutsky, 1978
Nitocrella unispinosa Shen & Tai, 1973
Nitocrella vasconica Chappuis, 1937
Nitocrella yokotai Miura, 1962

References

Harpacticoida
Taxonomy articles created by Polbot